Athwalines is a suburban area located in South West Zone of Surat. Athwalines area under the surat municipality corporation (SMC). Athwalines is well developed area in surat.

See also 

Surat
List of tourist attractions in Surat

Suburban area of Surat
Neighbourhoods in Surat